Nitela is a genus of wasps belonging to the family Crabronidae.

The genus has cosmopolitan distribution.

Species:
 Nitela amazonica Ducke, 1903 
 Nitela apoensis Tsuneki, 1992

References

Crabronidae
Hymenoptera genera